Herdy Gerdy is an action-adventure platforming strategy puzzle video game for the PlayStation 2 console, released in 2002. It is developed by Core Design and published by Eidos Interactive. The game involves herding animals, navigating obstacles, and solving puzzles. The player has to collect a variety of herding tools, and there are alternate pathways to reach the end.

Gameplay
The game is best described as a virtual shepherd sim, with some adventure and platform elements. The player must herd enough creatures into their pens to unlock areas and new levels. However, the various creatures have certain reactions and skills; some swim while some drown, for example. The levels themselves are difficult to negotiate, with pirate ships, winding caverns, and ruins blocking Gerdy's path. The creatures are controlled by a complex but flawed artificial intelligence. They are prone to getting stuck, sometimes irretrievably, on objects in the environment owing to a lack of adequate collision detection. It has a large environment (around 40 different areas) as well as 12 different fictional creatures to herd into their different pens. The game requires strategic thinking as some animals eat the others, some animals cannot jump, some cannot swim and each animal kind requires a separate herding technique. The heads-up display is relatively simple: there are three colored displays at the top of the screen. To the left, the display shows the number of dead animals. The next, in the centre of the screen, represents those alive and free, and the display on the right shows those that have been captured. Herdy Gerdy is plagued by automatic camera problems. Although the game features manual camera control, when the view between Gerdy and the camera is obstructed control reverts to automatic often to the chagrin of the player. At the bottom of the screen is a progress bar with dots: each dot confirms that you have captured 5% of the animals in the level. Finally, the map shows the player's position, animals, pens, rainbow buttons, and the gypsy at the end of the level.

Plot
The game begins with Gerdy attempting to wake his sleeping father, Master Herder Gedryn, who is going to be late for the annual herding competition. It is soon revealed that Gerdy's dad has been placed under a spell by the evil wizard Sadorf. Gerdy is determined to save his dad and the magical island that they live on from Sadorf's evil rule. First he goes to his village to receive herding training from Yggdrasil, a wise old sage, who gives him the Herding Stick. Then he travels to Midmear where he receives the Magic Flute from Red, a magician in training. Soon after that, Gerdy obtains the Magic Horn after beating Efrin, a teenage boy who lives in the Elven Wood. Gerdy heads into the Gold Mine Gorge where he meets Jake, an old gold miner that has recently invented the ladder. However, the ladder cannot support Gerdy's weight, so the young boy must venture on to Belder's Spring. Belder's Spring is an underground spring haunted by the ghost of a miner. Belder, the ghost, gives Gerdy a Magic Feather which will cause him to weigh virtually nothing, allowing him to climb ladders. Gerdy heads up through the mountains to Moonlit Peaks, a snow-covered cliff. There he finds Poric, an old Leprechaun who guards his gold carefully. Gerdy manages to steal Poric's Magic Hammer, allowing him to activate Rainbow Switches. He heads back to Elven Wood, and gets through using his new item. He continues on into Forest Glade, but stops after reaching Crystal Lake. Due to his inability to swim, Gerdy is unable to get to a Gypsy on the other side of a pool. Gerdy explores until he meets a mole living underground. The mole gives him some Magic Gloves, allowing him to push large blocks. Gerdy travels back to Midmear and enters the Ancient Temple. After beating the tricks and traps there, he comes out into Pirate Cove. There he meets a pirate that takes him to an island inhabited by a giant bird. Gerdy defeats the winged terror known as Skrag, and wins the Magic Swimsuit. He goes back to Crystal Lake and crosses the pool to get to the Gypsy. Gerdy make his way through the rest of the forest to Foxtown. He hitches a ride with a baker to Tournament Island and defeats Sadorf, thus saving the entire Island and his father.

Reception

Herdy Gerdy received mixed to positive reviews from critics. It has an aggregate score of 69.93% on GameRankings and 69/100 on Metacritic.

References

External links

2002 video games
3D platform games
Action-adventure games
Core Design games
Eidos Interactive games
PlayStation 2 games
PlayStation 2-only games
Puzzle video games
Strategy video games
Video games scored by Peter Connelly
Single-player video games
Video games developed in the United Kingdom